First West Credit Union (First West) is British Columbia’s third largest credit union with nearly $16.9 billion in total assets and assets under administration and more than 250,000 members. Its core business is traditional banking, the provision of personal and business daily banking services. First West has the largest geographic reach of any credit union in the province with 45 branches throughout B.C. The credit union is headquartered in the Vancouver suburb of Langley and has regional administration centres in Duncan on Vancouver Island and in Penticton in B.C.’s Southern Interior.

Led by Chief Executive Officer Launi Skinner, First West has several subsidiary lines of business that include FWCU Capital Corp. and FW Wealth Management Ltd.

First West operates 46 business locations under the following four divisions:

Envision Financial: Lower Mainland, Fraser Valley, Kitimat.
Valley First: Southern interior including the Okanagan and Kamloops. 
Island Savings on Vancouver Island and the southern Gulf Island of Saltspring Island. 
Enderby & District Financial: North Okanagan communities
 
First West also operates wealth management and junior capital lines of business.

Other notable achievements
The founding credit unions that merged to form First West have both been recognized in previous years for significant achievements or contributions to their communities. Valley First is recognized for a longstanding tradition of supporting charities, organizations, and events, including, among others, Feed the Valley.  For eight years, The Globe and Mails Report on Business Magazine has named Envision Financial one of the "50 Best Employers in Canada." Island Savings also consistently achieved recognition among Aon Hewitt's "50 Best Employers in Canada." First West is also designated as a Caring Company by Imagine Canada.

References

External links
First West Credit Union official site
Envision Financial official site
Valley First official site
Enderby & District Financial official site
Island Savings official site
First West Capital official site

 
Canadian companies established in 2010
Banks established in 2010
Companies based in British Columbia
Langley, British Columbia (district municipality)
Credit unions of British Columbia
2010 establishments in British Columbia